Sattam Sirikkiradhu is a 1982 Tamil-language drama film, directed by T. R. Ramanna. The film stars Vijayakanth, Jyothi, Prathap K. Pothan and Mucherla Aruna.

Cast
Vijayakanth 
Jyothi 
Prathap K. Pothan 
Mucherla Aruna
Manorama

Soundtrack
Soundtrack was composed by T. Rajendar.
"Kanakambaram Poo Vangu" - T. S. Kalyanam
"Malare Malare Unakindru" - P. Susheela
"Kangal Kallanadu" - S. P. Balasubrahmanyam, S. Janaki 
"Malai Mugapinil" - Kalyanam, S. Janaki

References

External links

1982 films
1980s Tamil-language films
Films directed by T. R. Ramanna
Films scored by T. Rajendar